Erannis jacobsoni, or Jacobson's spanworm, is a moth of the family Geometridae. The species was first described by Alexander Michailovitsch Djakonov in 1926. It is found in Europe (Russia: eastern Siberia, the Russian Far East and western Siberia) and Asia (China: Nei Menggu, Japan: Hokkaido, Honshu and Shikoku, Kazakhstan and Mongolia).

The larvae feed on Larix species, including L. gmelinii and L. sibirica.

References

Moths described in 1926
Bistonini